Candarave Province is the smallest of four provinces in the Tacna Region in southern Peru. Its capital is Candarave.

Boundaries
North: Moquegua Region
East: Puno Region
South: Tarata Province
West: Jorge Basadre Province

Geography 
Some of the highest peaks of the province are Tutupaka and Yukamani, both are active volcanoes. Other mountains are listed below:

Political division
The province is divided into six districts (singular: distrito), each of which is headed by a mayor (alcalde):

Candarave
Cairani
Camilaca
Curibaya
Huanuara
Quilahuani

Ethnic groups 
The province is inhabited by indigenous citizens of Aymara descent. Spanish, however, is the language which the majority of the population (78.17%) learnt to speak in childhood, 20.94% of the residents started speaking using the Aymara language (2007 Peru Census).

See also 
 Pharaquta

References 

Provinces of the Tacna Region